Haiti participated in the 2015 Parapan American Games.

Competitors
The following table lists Haiti's delegation per sport and gender.

Powerlifting

Women

References

2015 in Haitian sport
Nations at the 2015 Parapan American Games
Haiti at the Pan American Games